Cerithiella insignis is a species of very small sea snail, a marine gastropod mollusk in the family Newtoniellidae. It was described by Jeffreys, in 1885.

References

Newtoniellidae
Gastropods described in 1885